Global Jet Luxembourg, formerly Silver Arrows, is a private Luxembourg air charter company operating business jets. It is headquartered in Hesperange and based at Luxembourg Airport.

The airline offers charter and leasing opportunities in Europe and Northern Africa.

Fleet

Current

See also
 List of airlines of Luxembourg

References

Airlines of Luxembourg
Airlines established in 1999
Luxembourgian companies established in 1999
Brands of Luxembourg
Airline headquarters